Albrecht von Rapperswil (also Raprechtswil, fl.  ca. 1280) is one of the Minnesingers featured in the Codex Manesse. He was a ministerialis in the service of the counts of Rapperswil, in the rank of a marchschal. Albrecht is depicted in Codex Manesse fol. 192v in the act of jousting. Three songs attributed to him are recorded on fol. 193r.
The songs are in three verses, with the first verse of each describing nature in springtime, and the second and third verse dedicated to the beauty of the beloved lady.

References 

Wolfgang Stammler, Karl Langosch et al.: Verfasserlexikon – Die deutsche Literatur des Mittelalters. S. 199/200. Walter de Gruyter, 1978, 

People from Rapperswil-Jona
House of Rapperswil
Minnesingers
13th-century Swiss people
13th-century German poets
Ministeriales